"Alarm" is Namie Amuro's 25th solo single under the Avex Trax label. Released in 2004, it became Namie's first solo single, and only as of 2010, to appear out of the Top 10 on the Oricon Charts. The single will be re-released on November 14, 2017 to try and enhance its original position, and reach the top ten.

Track listing
 "Alarm" (Jusme, Monk) – 4:16
 "Strobe" (Jusme, Monk) – 4:41
 "Alarm (Instrumental)" (Monk) – 4:16
 "Strobe (Instrumental)" (Monk) – 4:37

Personnel
 Namie Amuro – vocals

TV performances
 March 18, 2004 – AX Music Factory
 April 2, 2004 – Pop Jam
 April 3, 2004 – CDTV
 April 5, 2004 – Hey! Hey! Hey!
 April 9, 2004 – Music Station
 May 23, 2004 – MTV Video Awards Japan 2004

Charts
Oricon Sales Chart (Japan)

Namie Amuro songs
2004 singles
2004 songs
Avex Trax singles